Abraham Lincoln Manley (December 22, 1885 – December 9, 1952) was an American Negro league baseball executive. He co-owned the Newark Eagles baseball franchise in the Negro leagues with his wife, Effa Manley, from 1935 to 1946.

Biography 
Manley was born in Hertford, North Carolina on December 22, 1885.

He met his wife, Effa, at a New York Yankees game in 1935, and involved her in the operation of his club.

An active owner, Manley also served as vice president and treasurer of the Negro National League at one point and also managed the Eagles in 1936 and 1938.

He died in Germantown, Pennsylvania on December 9, 1952, roughly two weeks before what would have been his 67th birthday. He was buried at St. Madeleine Sophie Catholic Church there in the city.

Legacy 

References

External links
Washington Post article
MLB.com
Sports Illustrated
Abe Manley at Seamheads.com
Abe Manley at Negro Leagues Baseball Museum

1885 births
1952 deaths
People from Hertford, North Carolina
Baseball executives
African-American sports executives and administrators
American sports executives and administrators
Negro league baseball executives
Negro league baseball managers
African-American Catholics
20th-century African-American people